The 1944–45 William & Mary Indians men's basketball team represented the College of William & Mary in intercollegiate basketball during the 1944–45 NCAA men's basketball season. Under the second, and final, year of head coach Rube McCray (who concurrently served as the head football coach), the team finished the season 7–10 and 3–4 in the Southern Conference. This was the 40th season of the collegiate basketball program at William & Mary, whose nickname is now the Tribe.

The Indians finished in 7th place in the conference and qualified for the 1945 Southern Conference men's basketball tournament, hosted by North Carolina State University at the Thompson Gym in Raleigh, North Carolina. William & Mary defeated The Citadel in the quarterfinals before falling to Duke in the semifinal round.

Schedule

|-
!colspan=9 style="background:#006400; color:#FFD700;"| Regular season

|-
!colspan=9 style="background:#006400; color:#FFD700;"| 1945 Southern Conference Tournament

Source

References

William & Mary Tribe men's basketball seasons
William and Mary Indians
William and Mary Indians Men's Basketball Team
William and Mary Indians Men's Basketball Team